Brachodes quiris is a moth of the family Brachodidae. It is found in South Africa.

References

Endemic moths of South Africa
Moths described in 1875
Brachodidae
Moths of Africa